CKPP-FM is a radio station which broadcasts a variety hits format on 107.9 MHz (FM) in Prescott, Ontario, Canada. CKPP's studio is located in Kemptville, while its transmitter is located near Prescott.

History
On February 16, 2011, Haliburton Broadcasting Group submitted an application to operate a new FM Radio station in the Town of Prescott at 107.9 MHz.
On November 10, 2011, this application received approval from the CRTC.

On April 23, 2012 Vista Broadcast Group, which owns a number of radio stations in western Canada, announced a deal to acquire Haliburton Broadcasting Group, in cooperation with Westerkirk Capital. The transaction was approved by the CRTC on October 19, 2012.

Launch as 107.9 Coast FM

CKPP began broadcasting as 107.9 Coast FM on October 20, 2015 At 12:00 PM EST.

Moose FM
On October 23, 2020, just five years after its airdate as Coast FM, the station changed its branding to 107.9 Moose FM retaining its classic hits but with a wider variety hits format.

References

External links
107.9 Moose FM
 

KPP
KPP
KPP
Radio stations established in 2011
2011 establishments in Ontario